Lawrence B. Banks (August 1, 1880 – September 29, 1935) was an American football player and coach.  He was the sixth head football coach for Washburn University in Topeka, Kansas, serving for one season, in 1901, and compiling a record of 3–2–3. The son of Alexander and Jennie Banks, Banks attended Washburn as a preparatory student from 1898 to 1900.  He died in 1935 of a cerebral hemorrhage.

Head coaching record

References

1880 births
1935 deaths
19th-century players of American football
American football guards
Washburn Ichabods football coaches
Washburn Ichabods football players
Sportspeople from Topeka, Kansas
Players of American football from Kansas